Hyllisia multigriseovittata is a species of beetle in the family Cerambycidae. It was described by Báguena and Breuning, in 1958.

References

multigriseovittata
Beetles described in 1958
Taxa named by Stephan von Breuning (entomologist)
Taxa named by Luis Báguena-Corella